FC Rubin Yalta (Russian: ФК «Рубин» Ялта) is an association football team from Yalta, Crimea. It plays in Avanhard Stadium (ru: стадион Авангард) on Biryukova St, 2а, Yalta, Crimea, 98601. The kit colors for home are red shirts and shorts and white socks. The kit colors for away are white shirts and socks and red shorts.

The club was established in 2009. After the Russian annexation of Crimea the club was forced to be reconstituted as a Russian club and then was allowed to be admitted to the Crimean Premier League.

League and cup history (Crimea)
{|class="wikitable"
|-bgcolor="#efefef"
! Season
! Div.
! Pos.
! Pl.
! W
! D
! L
! GS
! GA
! P
!Domestic Cup
!colspan=2|Europe
!Notes
|-
|align=center|2015
|align=center|1st All-Crimean Championship Gr. B
|align=center|4/10
|align=center|9
|align=center|5
|align=center|3
|align=center|1
|align=center|16
|align=center|5
|align=center|18
|align=center|
|align=center|
|align=center|
|align=center bgcolor=brick|Reorganization of competitions
|-
|align=center|2015–16
|align=center|1st Premier League
|align=center|7/8
|align=center|28
|align=center|9
|align=center|5
|align=center|14
|align=center|33
|align=center|38
|align=center|32
|align=center|Group stage
|align=center|
|align=center|
|align=center|1st–2nd league match (winner)
|-
|align=center|2016–17
|align=center|1st Premier League
|align=center|7/8
|align=center|28
|align=center|7
|align=center|7
|align=center|14
|align=center|25
|align=center|42
|align=center|28
|align=center| finals
|align=center|
|align=center|
|align=center|
|-
|align=center|2017–18
|align=center|1st Premier League
|align=center|8/8
|align=center|28
|align=center|2
|align=center|7
|align=center|19
|align=center|18
|align=center|68
|align=center|13
|align=center bgcolor=tan| finals
|align=center|
|align=center|
|align=center bgcolor=pink|Relegated
|- align=center bgcolor=LightCyan
|align=center|2018–19
|align=center|2nd Open Championship
|align=center bgcolor=tan|3/17
|align=center|29
|align=center|21
|align=center|3
|align=center|5
|align=center|98
|align=center|42
|align=center|66
|align=center|
|align=center|
|align=center|
|align=center|
|- bgcolor=LightCyan
|align=center|2019–20
|align=center|2nd Open Championship
|align=center bgcolor=tan|3/12
|align=center|22
|align=center|17
|align=center|2
|align=center|3
|align=center|94
|align=center|20
|align=center|53
|align=center| finals
|align=center|
|align=center|
|align=center|
|- bgcolor=LightCyan
|align=center|2020–21
|align=center|2nd Open Championship
|align=center bgcolor=gold|1/7
|align=center|12
|align=center|9
|align=center|3
|align=center|0
|align=center|41
|align=center|9
|align=center|30
|align=center|
|align=center|
|align=center|
|align=center bgcolor=lightgreen|Promoted
|-
|align=center|2021–22
|align=center|1st Premier League
|align=center|
|align=center|
|align=center|
|align=center|
|align=center|
|align=center|
|align=center|
|align=center|
|align=center|
|align=center|
|align=center|
|align=center|
|-
|}

References

External links
Rubin Yalta on CrimeanSport.ru 

 
Football clubs in Yalta
Association football clubs established in 2009
2009 establishments in Ukraine